Abraham Isaac Lastfogel (May 17, 1898 – August 27, 1984) was one of the first employees and a long-time president of the William Morris Agency, a large diversified talent agency.

Early life 
Lastfogel was the seventh son of a Jewish animal skinner who had fled Russia in 1889 to escape the pogroms. He was raised in a cold-water flat in New York.

Career 
The William Morris Agency hired Lastfogel in 1912 as an office boy. Finding success in the rapidly growing firm, Lastfogel moved to Hollywood in 1932 to manage WMA's Los Angeles office. He became chairman of the agency while William Morris Jr. served as president.

USO shows 
During World War II, Lastfogel oversaw USO camp shows, which were wartime entertainment events featuring more than 7,000 performers seen by an estimated 200 million servicemen.

Personal life 
In 1927, Lastfogel married Frances Arms, a former Vaudeville performer. They had no children.

Lastfogel died of a heart attack in 1984 at Cedars-Sinai Medical Center in Los Angeles and was interred at the Hillside Memorial Park Cemetery.

References

Further reading 
 Rose, Frank. The Agency: William Morris and the Hidden History of Show Business. New York: HarperCollins, 1995.  

1898 births
1984 deaths
People from Manhattan
People from Los Angeles
American talent agents
American people of Russian-Jewish descent
Burials at Hillside Memorial Park Cemetery